Elvia Hernández García (born 14 July 1962) is a Mexican politician from the Institutional Revolutionary Party. From 2009 to 2012s she served as Deputy of the LXI Legislature of the Mexican Congress representing the State of Mexico.

References

1962 births
Living people
Politicians from the State of Mexico
Women members of the Chamber of Deputies (Mexico)
Institutional Revolutionary Party politicians
21st-century Mexican politicians
21st-century Mexican women politicians
Deputies of the LXI Legislature of Mexico
Members of the Chamber of Deputies (Mexico) for the State of Mexico